Oasen is a public swimming pool built inside a rock cavern in Namsos, Norway. It is one of four Olympic-size swimming pools in Norway, featuring a 50-metre pool. It opened in 1988.

References

Swimming venues in Norway
Namsos
Sports venues in Trøndelag
1988 establishments in Norway